The 2019 NCAA Beach Volleyball Championship was the fourth annual tournament deciding the NCAA champions for the 2019 collegiate beach volleyball season. It took place May 3–5 in Gulf Shores, Alabama, and was hosted by the University of Alabama at Birmingham. It was a double elimination tournament, with a single championship match. The Bruins won their second championship in a row by defeating Southern Cal 3–0 in the championship match on May 5, 2019.

Qualification
The tournament was open to teams from Divisions I, II, and III. The top three teams each in the East and West Regions qualified automatically, and two additional teams were selected at large. Selections for the tournament were announced on April 28 on NCAA.com.

Bracket

All-Tournament Team
At the conclusion of the championship, five pairs (selected from all teams in the field) were honored as members of the All-Tournament Team.

Media Coverage
In December 2017, ESPN was awarded a 5-year contract to provide television coverage of the NCAA Women’s Beach Volleyball Championship, beginning with the 2018 season. In addition, the Selection Show for the championship tournament was broadcast on April 28 at NCAA.com.

Television channels
The 14 dual matches comprising the entirety of the championship were broadcast live on the following channels at the specified times:
 Day 1: Opening Rounds (Matches/Duals 1-8) - ESPNU, 9:00 AM - 5:00 PM CDT 
 Day 2: Third Round (Match/Dual 11); Elimination Bracket: Second and Third Rounds (Matches/Duals 9-10, 12) - ESPN2 (later rebroadcast on ESPNU), 9:00 AM - 1:00 PM CDT
 Day 3: Semifinal/Elimination Bracket Final (Match/Dual 13) - ESPN2, 9:30 AM CDT
 Day 3: National Championship Final (Match/Dual 14) - ESPN, 1:00 PM CDT
 Day 3: Trophy Ceremony - ESPN3, 3:00 PM CDT

References

2019 in American sports
2019 in beach volleyball
2019 in women's volleyball
2019 in sports in Alabama